John Crossingham is a Canadian indie rock singer-songwriter based in Toronto, Ontario. He performs with the bands Raising the Fawn and Broken Social Scene.

References

Year of birth missing (living people)
Living people
Canadian singer-songwriters
Canadian rock singers
Musicians from Toronto
Canadian indie rock musicians
Broken Social Scene members
20th-century Canadian male singers
21st-century Canadian male singers
Canadian male singer-songwriters